The 2015 Southampton City Council election took place on 7 May 2015 to elect members of Southampton City Council in England. This was on the same day as other local elections.

After the election, the composition of the council was:
Labour 26 (-2)
Conservative 20 (+2)
Councillors Against Cuts 2

Just one week after the election, newly re-elected Labour councillor for Redbridge, Andrew Pope, who had represented the area since 2011, left Labour to sit as an independent, citing concerns he had with the leader of the council, Simon Letts, who he accused of "putting his own position ahead of the people of Southampton" and of lacking "vision and strong leadership".

Election result
Southampton Council is elected in thirds, which means all comparisons are to the corresponding 2011 Southampton Council election.

Ward results

References

2015 English local elections
May 2015 events in the United Kingdom
2015
2010s in Southampton